Konde may refer to:

Places
 Kondé, Benin
 Kondey or Kondē, Maldives
 Micheweni District (formerly Konde District), Tanzania

Ethnic groups and languages
 Nyakyusa people
 Nyakyusa language
 Konde, a dialect of the Ronga language

People with the surname
 Agnes Konde, Ugandan businesswoman
 Fundi Konde (1924–2000), Kenyan musician
 Oumar Kondé (born 1979), Swiss footballer of Congolese descent